Saavedra may refer to: 


Places
 Saavedra, Buenos Aires,  Argentina
 Saavedra, Chile, a commune in the Araucanía Region
 Saavedra Partido, a partido or department of Buenos Aires Province
 Saavedra (Santa Cruz), a town in Santa Cruz department, Bolivia
 Saavedra, a barangay of the town Moalboal in Southern Cebu, Philippines

People
 Saavedra (surname)

Other uses
 Saavedra position, a famous endgame study in chess

See also
 Cornelio Saavedra Province, Bolivia